The El Cien Formation is a geologic formation in eastern Baja California Sur state, Mexico.

Subunits, from younger/higher to older/lower, include the Cerro Colorado Member, San Hilario Member, and Cerro Tierra Blanca Member.

Fossil record 
It preserves fossils dating back to the Oligocene epoch of the Paleogene period and Early Miocene epoch of the Neogene period, during the Cenozoic Era.

See also 
 
 List of fossiliferous stratigraphic units in Mexico

References 

Geologic formations of Mexico
Miocene Series of North America
Oligocene Series of North America
Paleogene Mexico
Neogene Mexico
Phosphorite formations
Geography of Baja California Sur
Natural history of Baja California Sur